Antelope Creek is a tributary of Dry Creek in Placer County, California. The creek is home to spring run Chinook salmon.

References

Rivers of Placer County, California